A music publisher is a type of publisher that specializes in distributing music. Music publishers originally published sheet music. When copyright became legally protected, music publishers started to play a role in the management of the intellectual property of composers.

Music print publishing 

The term music publisher originally referred to publishers who issued hand-copied or printed sheet music.

Examples (who are actively in business ) include:
 Breitkopf & Härtel, Leipzig, Germany, founded 1719
 , Mainz, Germany, 1770
 Oxford University Press, University of Oxford, England, founded 18th century
 Edition Peters, Leipzig, 1800
 Casa Ricordi, Milan, Italy, founded 1808 (now owned by Universal Music Publishing Group)
 G. Schirmer, Inc., New York, United States, founded 1861 (now owned by Wise Music Group)
 Universal Edition, Vienna, Austria, 1901
 Bärenreiter, Germany, founded 1923
 Boosey & Hawkes, London, England, founded 1930 (now owned by Concord)
 Hans Sikorski, Hamburg, Germany, 1935 (now owned by Concord)
 PWM, Kraków, Poland, founded 1945
 G. Henle Verlag, Munich, Germany, founded 1948

Other media

Intellectual property management 
In the music industry, a music publisher or publishing company is responsible for ensuring the songwriters and composers receive payment when their compositions are used commercially. Through an agreement called a publishing contract, a songwriter or composer "assigns" the copyright of their composition to a publishing company. In return, the company licenses compositions, helps monitor where compositions are used, collects royalties and distributes them to the composers. They also secure commissions for music and promote existing compositions to recording artists, film and television.

The copyrights owned and administered by publishing companies are one of the most important forms of intellectual property in the music industry. (The other is the copyright on a master recording which is typically owned by a record company). Publishing companies play a central role in managing this vital asset.

The music publisher's role

Successful songwriters and composers have a relationship with a publishing company defined by a publishing contract.  Publishers also sometimes provide substantial advances against future income. In return, the publishing company receives a percentage, which can be as high as 50% and varies for different kinds of royalty.

There are several types of royalty: mechanical royalties derive from the sale of recorded music, such as CDs or digital downloads. These royalties are paid to publishers by record companies (through the Harry Fox Agency as well as through American Mechanical Rights Agency in the U.S.). Performance royalties are collected by performance rights organizations such as SESAC, Broadcast Music, Inc., American Society of Composers, Authors and Publishers or PRS and are paid by radio stations and others who broadcast recorded music; and are paid by venues, event organizers for live performances of the compositions. Synchronization royalties are required when a composition is used in a film or television soundtrack. These royalties typically pass through the hands of a music publisher before they reach the composer.

Publishers also work to link up new songs by songwriters with suitable recording artists to record them and to place writers' songs in other media such as movie soundtracks and commercials. They will typically also handle copyright registration and "ownership" matters for the composer. Music print publishers also supervise the issue of songbooks and sheet music by their artists.

Publishing disputes

Traditionally, music publishing royalties are split seventy/thirty, with thirty percent going to the publisher (as payment for their services) and the rest going to the songwriter or songwriters. Other arrangements have been made in the past, and continue to be; some better for the writers, some better for the publishers. Occasionally a recording artist will ask for a co-writer's credit on a song (thus sharing in both the artist and publishing royalties) in exchange for selecting it to perform, particularly if the writer is not well known. Sometimes an artist's manager or producer will expect a co-credit or share of the publishing (as with Norman Petty and Phil Spector), and occasionally a publisher will insist on writer's credit (as Morris Levy did with several of his acts); these practices are listed in ascending order of scrupulousness, as regarded by the music industry.

The most unscrupulous type of music publisher is the songshark, who does little if any real "legwork" or promotion on behalf of songwriters. Songsharks make their profit not on royalties from sales, but by charging inexperienced writers for "services" (some real, such as demo recording or musical arranging, some fictional, such as "audition" or "review" fees) a legitimate publisher would provide without cost to the writer, as part of their job. (By comparison, a bona fide publisher who charges admission to a workshop for writers, where songs may be auditioned or reviewed, isn't wrong to do so.)

Rock-n-roll pioneer Buddy Holly split with longtime manager Petty over publishing matters in late 1958, as did the Buckinghams with producer James William Guercio almost a decade later. John Fogerty of Creedence Clearwater Revival (CCR) was sued by his former publisher Saul Zaentz (who'd also served as his manager) over a later Fogerty song that sounded slightly like a CCR song Zaentz published. (Fogerty won in court.)

Several bands and artists own (or later purchase) their own publishing, and start their own companies, with or without help from an outside agent. The sale or loss of publishing ownership can be devastating to a given artist or writer, financially and emotionally. R&B legend Little Richard was largely cheated on his music publishing and copyrights, as were many performers. Brian Wilson and Mike Love of The Beach Boys were crushed to learn that Murry Wilson (father to three of the Beach Boys, Love's uncle, and the band's music publisher) had sold their company Sea of Tunes to A&M Records during 1969 for a fraction of what it was worth – or earned in the following years.

A large factor in the Beatles' breakup was when their publisher Dick James sold his share of Northern Songs, the company they'd formed with him in 1963 (then taken public in 1967, with shares trading on the London Stock Exchange), to Britain's Associated TeleVision (ATV) in 1969. Neither the Beatles nor managers Lee Eastman and Allen Klein were able to prevent ATV from becoming majority stockholders in Northern Songs, whose assets included virtually all the group's song copyrights. Losing control of the company, John Lennon and Paul McCartney elected to sell their share of Northern Songs (and thus their own copyrights), while retaining their writer's royalties. (George Harrison and Ringo Starr retained minority holdings in the company.)

See also
Transcription (music)
List of record labels

Notes

Further reading

External links
How To Start A Music Publishing Company on Music Powers
Beware the Song Shark! on BMI.com

 
Music publishing
Occupations in music